This is a list of words used in mainstream South African English but not usually found in other dialects of the English language. For internationally common English words of South African origin, see List of English words of Afrikaans origin.

A-B

 aikhona (informal) meaning ''no'' or ''hell no''
 Amasi fermented milk, sometimes called maas.
 bakkie a utility truck or pickup truck. Can also mean a small basin or other container.
 bergie (informal) refers to a particular subculture of vagrants in Cape Town (from Afrikaans berg (mountain), originally referring to vagrants who sheltered in the forests of Table Mountain). Increasingly used in other cities to mean a vagrant of any description. The term hobo is also used for homeless vagrants. 
 bioscope, bio cinema; movie theatre (now dated)
 biltong cured meat, similar to jerky
 bladdy (informal) occasionally heard South African version of bloody (the predominantly heard form), from the Cape Coloured/Afrikaans blerrie, itself a corruption of the English word
 boerewors traditional sausage (from Afrikaans "farmer’s sausage"), usually made with a mixture of course-ground beef and pork and seasoned with spices such as coriander. Droëwors is boerewors with vinegar added as a preservative that has been cured similar to biltong.
 boy in addition to its normal meaning, an archaic and derogatory term for a male domestic servant of colour, for example, a gardener may be called a garden boy (not uncommon)
 braai a barbecue, to barbecue 
 buck a rand, referring to the Springbok that is featured on the South African R1-coin (one rand coin). 
 bundu, bundus a wilderness region, remote from cities (from Shona bundo, meaning grasslands) 
 bunny chow loaf of bread filled with curry, speciality of Durban, particularly Indian South Africans  also called a kota by black South Africans, on account of it commonly being sold in a quarter loaf of bread (see also spatlo).
 bokkie originally referring to a baby antelope. It refers to a nubile (often Afrikaner) white girl, and it can also be applied as a pet-name between lovers.

C-E

 cafe when pronounced  refers to a convenience store not a coffee shop (originally such stores sold coffee and other basic items) called a tea room by Durbanites.
 checkers
A plastic carrier bag, named after the South African grocery chain ‘Checkers’.
 china (informal) a friend, abbreviated Cockney rhyming slang, "china plate", for "mate" e.g. "Howzit my China?" 
 circle Used to refer to the shape but also used to refer to a traffic roundabout, given its circular shape
 Coloured refers to typically brown skinned South Africans of mixed European and Khoisan or black and/or Malay ancestry, a definition formally codified under apartheid.
 combi/kombi/coombi a mini-van, people-carrier, especially referring to the Volkswagen Type 2 and its descendants. Not usually used in the context of minibus taxis, which are referred to as taxis.
 cool drink, cold drink soft drink, fizzy drink (not necessarily chilled). Groovy was used to refer to canned soft drinks (after one of the first brands to introduce the container to South Africa)  :may refer to a bribe, typically to a traffic cop
 creepy crawly Kreepy Krauly automated pool cleaner
 dagga (pronounced  or more commonly) marijuana
 donga an erosion ditch of the type found in South African topography (from Zulu, wall)
 draadkar/draad-kar a toy car which is constructed out of throw-away steel wires.
 entjie a cigarette.
 erf
 (plural erfs, in English, erven/erve in Dutch/Afrikaans) a plot of land in an urban area (from Cape Dutch)

F-J
 geyser a domestic hot water heater, particularly a storage hot water heater
 girl in addition to its normal meaning, archaic and derogatory term for a female domestic servant of colour. Superseded by "maid", and more recently "domestic worker" or "domestic".
 gogga (pronounced , the latter similar to the Afrikaans pronunciation) a creepy crawly or an insect 
 gogo Zulu word meaning grandmother/grandma, also used as a general term of respect for women of appropriate age. Became part of the iconic slogan Yebo Gogo (Yes, Grandma) from the South African cellular service-provider Vodacom
homeland under apartheid, typically referred to a self-governing "state" for black South Africans
 howzit (colloquial) hello, how are you, good morning (despite being a contracted of 'how is it going', howzit is almost exclusively a greeting, and seldom a question)
 imbizo A meeting or conference, similar to a legotla or indaba, formerly called a bosberaad (Afrikaans for bush meeting): often a retreat for senior government and political officials to discuss policy.
 is it? (colloquial) Is that so? An all purpose exclamative, can be used in any context where "really?", "uh-huh", etc. would be appropriate, e.g. "I'm feeling pretty tired." "Is it?".
 indaba a conference (from Zulu, "a matter for discussion")
 jam (informal) can also be referred to as having a good time, partying, drinking etc. e.g. "Let's jam soon"
 ja (colloquial) yes (from Afrikaans "yes"). Pronounced "ya".
 janee, ja-nee, ja/nee, ja nee (colloquial)  meaning yes/agreed, in response to a question: "Ja no, that's fine." (From Afrikaans "ja nee", which is used in the same sense)
 jol (informal, pronounced ) another term more commonly used for partying and drinking. e.g. "It was a jol" or "I am jolling with you soon." Can also mean having a lighthearted fling or affair ("I'm jolling that cherrie").
 just now idiomatically used to mean soon, later, in a short while, or a short time ago, but unlike the UK not immediately.

K-L

 kaffir (derogatory/offensive, pronounced ) a black-skinned person (from Arabic kafir meaning non-believer) used as a racial slur 
 kif (informal) indicating appreciation, like "cool" 
 kip a nap
 Klaas Vakie the Sandman
 koki, koki pen (pronounced ) a fibre-tip pen or sharpie (from a defunct local brand name). 
 koppie a small hill, (also Afrikaans for a cup/mug)
 koeksister a Dutch-derived sweet pastry dessert dipped in a syrup. Pastry is traditionally shaped in the form of a French braid. The name ''koeksister'' translates as ''Cake-sister''
 lapa permanent, semi-open thatched structure used for entertaining
 lekker
 (informal, pronounced ) nice, pleasant, enjoyable (from Afrikaans "nice") 
 lappie (informal) a small dishcloth used for cleaning, as opposed to a dishcloth or teatowel 
 laaitie (informal) one's own child or younger brother, specifically refers to a young boy, or to refer to a young person as a lightweight or inexperienced in something particular 
 location, kasi an apartheid-era urban area populated by Blacks, Cape Coloureds, or Indians. It was replaced by "township" in common usage amongst Whites but is still widely used by Blacks in the form of kasi

M-N

 matric school-leaving certificate or the final year of high school or a student in the final year, short for matriculation 
 mielie, mealie an ear of maize (from Afrikaans mielie) 
 mieliemeel, mealie meal used for both cornmeal (maize meal) and the traditional porridge made from it similar to polenta, the latter also commonly known by the Afrikaans word pap, and is a traditional staple food of black South Africans. See pap
 Melktert/Milktart a Dutch custard-tart with a strong milk flavor, usually sprinkled with cinnamon on top.
 monkey's wedding a sunshower.
 Moola currency used by the now-defunct South African mobile-data service Mxit; money in general
 morgan a traditional unit of measurement of land area of Dutch origin, that is approximately equal to two acres.
muti any sort of medicine but especially something unfamiliar (Zulu for traditional medicine) 
 Mzansi another name for South Africa, from the Xhosa word for "South".
 naartjie a mandarin orange (from Indonesian via Afrikaans), a tangerine in Britain. Mandarin is used in Durban, rather than naartjie
 now now (colloquial) derived from the Afrikaans ''nou-nou'' (which can be used both in future- and immediate past-tense)  idiomatically used to mean soon, but not immediately (sooner than just now in South Africa, but similar to just now in the United Kingdom)

O-R
 outjie a person, similar to "bloke" (man)
 ousie Afrikaans for maid/housekeeper, usually applied only to female housekeepers of colour, but is far more derogatory than maid/mate and is often never used except to be derogatory. 
 pap porridge-like dish made from maize meal (cornmeal)
 poppie (informal) a ditzy woman (derogatory term), from the Afrikaans word pop, meaning a doll
 potjie a cast iron dutch oven.
 robot besides the standard meaning, in South Africa this is also used for traffic lights. The etymology of the word derives from a description of early traffic lights as robot policemen, which then got truncated with time.
 rondavel round free-standing hut-like structure, usually with a thatched roof,.
 rusk a type of bread or pastry that was traditionally dried to extend its shelf life, and that is dipped in tea or coffee.

S
samp dried and roughly ground maize kernels, similar to American grits
 sarmie a sandwich
 samoosa a small triangular pastry of Indian origin. South African spelling and pronunciation of  samosa.
 Sangoma a traditional African healer
 shame
 an exclamation denoting sympathy as in "shame, you poor thing, you must be cold". Also used to describe a ''cuteness factor''.
 sharp, shapp, shapp-shapp, pashasha, pashash General positive exclamation meaning "OK", "all's good", "no worries", or "goodbye". Often accompanied by a thumbs-up gesture. A similar, more recent term used in Cape Town is aweh. Also means intelligent (that laaitie is sharp).
 shebeen (also used in Ireland and Scotland) an illegal drinking establishment, nowadays meaning any legal, informal bar, especially in townships
 shongololo, songololo millipede (from Zulu and Xhosa, ukushonga, to roll up) 
 skyfie segment of an orange or other citrus fruit
 snackwich a Jaffle-style toasted sandwich made in an electric toaster
 sosatie a kebab on a stick 
 soutie derogatory term for an English-speaking South African, from the Afrikaans soutpiel (literally "salty penis"), which referred to British colonial settlers who had one foot in England, one foot in South Africa and, consequently, their manhood dangling in the Atlantic Ocean.
 spanspek a cantaloupe
 spaza  an informal trading post/convenience store found in townships and remote areas 
 standard besides other meanings, used to refer to a school grade higher than grades 1 and 2 (now defunct)
 State President head of state between 1961 and 1994 - the position is now the President of South Africa

Stompie

A discarded cigarette / cigarette butt-end. Also: another name for a rumour that is generally made up and not reliable.

T-Z

 tackies, takkies, tekkies sneakers, trainers
 tea room convenience store, used by Durbanites (see also cafe).
 thumb suck an estimate that is based on a pure guess and not based on any sort of analysis.
 tickey box, ticky-box, tiekieboks a payphone, derived from "tickey" coin (threepenny coin minted in 1892), as one had to insert a coin to make a call. Archaic, and superseded by public phone and payphone. 
 town the Central Business District (CBD) of a town or city, used without the definite article ("let's go to town to buy clothes"). CBD tends to be used in more formal contexts.
 township residential area, historically reserved for black Africans, Coloureds or Indians under apartheid. Sometimes also used to describe impoverished formally designated residential areas largely populated by black Africans, established post-Apartheid. Formerly called a location. Also has a distinct legal meaning in South Africa's system of land title, with no racial connotations.
 veld  virgin bush, especially grassland or wide open rural spaces. Afrikaans for Field.
 vetkoek Afrikaner deep fried dough bread

See also
List of South African slang words

References

South African English
Languages of South Africa
South African regionalisms
South Africa
English regionalisms